"The Fall" is a song from American industrial metal band Ministry. It was the first single from the band's sixth studio album, Filth Pig.  The single hit number eighteen on the Billboard Dance chart. It reached number 53 in the UK.

Track listing
Writing credits taken from BMI

References

1996 singles
Ministry (band) songs
1995 songs
Sire Records singles
Warner Records singles
Songs written by Al Jourgensen